Pia Lamberty (born 11 February 1984) is a German social psychologist who researches conspiracy ideologies. She is a co-founder and co-CEO of the Center for Monitoring, Analysis and Strategy (CeMAS).

Early life and career 
Lamberty was born in Groß-Gerau on 11 February 1984. She completed a bachelor's degree in literature and philosophy at RWTH Aachen University, and later completed a master's degree in comparative literature and cultural poetics at the University of Münster.

From June 2015 to January 2016, Lamberty worked as a research assistant for the University of Cologne's Social Cognition Center. She worked on the project "Seventy Years Later: Historical Representations of the Holocaust and their effects on German-Israeli Relations". Since November 2016, she has been working as a PhD student at the University of Mainz. Lamberty is a member of Comparative Analysis of Conspiracy Theories in Europe, an international specialist network. 

In May 2020, Lamberty co-authored the book Fake Facts - Wie Verschwörungstheorien unser Denken bestimmen (Fake Facts - How Conspiracy Theories Influence Our Thinking) with civil rights activist Katharina Nocun. The book explores the reasons why people may be drawn to conspiracy theories.

In March 2021, Lamberty co-founded the Center for Monitoring, Analysis and Strategy (CeMAS), an extremism monitoring agency and think tank. She is also its co-CEO.

Personal life 
Lamberty has described receiving threats from conspiracy theorists as a result of her work in researching conspiracy ideologies, particularly due to the COVID-19 protests in Germany.

References 

1984 births
Social psychologists
People from Groß-Gerau
Academic staff of the University of Cologne
German women psychologists
RWTH Aachen University alumni
University of Münster alumni
Johannes Gutenberg University Mainz alumni
Living people